Donald McPherson (born March 11, 1969) is an American fashion photographer who was born in Miami, Florida. Moving to Europe in 1992 to pursue his career, McPherson met the fashion editor Isabella Blow who became a close friend and an invaluable source of inspiration. Sharing an apartment in Paris, they developed a close working relationship. McPherson photographed the first fashion story for Tatler with Blow, working as fashion director, showcasing the retrospect of Manolo Blahnik. McPherson refers to Blow as the one who "brings ideas out of me and helps me take them to the next level". McPherson returned to New York City in 1998 and was introduced to Stephen Sprouse, who further influenced his photographic style.

McPherson contributes to fashion magazines such as Harper's Bazaar, Rolling Stone, Vanity Fair, New York Times Magazine, Vogue Nippon and Russian Vogue. His clients include Valentino, Lacoste, Barney's, Max Mara, Paul Smith, Levi's, Hanes, Estée Lauder, Fila, Canon, Sony, Saks Fifth Avenue, Target, Lux and Badgley Mischka.

McPherson has worked with numerous celebrities, including David Bowie, Beastie Boys, Gwen Stefani, Ashton Kutcher, Matthew Modine, Grace Jones, Duchess of York, Jason Schwartzman, Sophia Bush, Ashley Tisdale, Adrien Brody, Sophie Dahl, Maggie Gyllenhaal, A Tribe Called Quest, Tom Cruise, Carolina Herrera, Fisherspooner, Chingy, Hanson, Keira Knightley, New Order, The Strokes and Stephen Sprouse.

References

External links

 Official website
 
 
 

1969 births
Living people
Fashion photographers
20th-century American photographers
American portrait photographers
Artists from Miami
21st-century American photographers